Holy Cross Church, also known as Iisalmi New Church, is a stone church in Iisalmi, Finland, which was consecrated in 1934. The church, designed by Eino Pitkänen, is a basilica with an end tower. The church, built of brick and concrete, represents a modernity based on classicism, which already resembles functionalism with its light wall surfaces. Before the association of municipalities and parishes in the North Savonian region in 1970, the Holy Cross Church was the main church of the Iisalmi Town Parish.

The altarpiece is a mosaic by artist Uuno Eskola and depicts the crucified Jesus.

See also 
 Gustav Adolf Church, Iisalmi

Sources

References

External links 

 Holy Cross Church at Iisalmen seurakunta (in Finnish)
 Iisalmen kirkkoaukio ja puistoakselit at Finnish Heritage Agency (in Finnish)

Buildings of Iisalmi
Churches completed in 1934
Lutheran churches in Finland